On 3 August 1979, a Constitutional Convention election was held in Gilan Province constituency with plurality-at-large voting format in order to decide three seats for the Assembly for the Final Review of the Constitution.

All seats went to Khomeinist candidates, who were affiliated with the Islamic Republican Party, the Society of Seminary Teachers of Qom and the Combatant Clergy Association. The clerical candidate supported by the Freedom Movement of Iran was placed fourth, ahead of a People's Mujahedin of Iran member listed by the Quintuple Coalition. Communist candidates of different groups were also all defeated, though they received a higher percentage of votes in comparison to communists in other provinces.

Results 

 
 
 
|-
|colspan="14" style="background:#E9E9E9;"|
|-
 
 
 
 
 
 
 
 
 
 
 
 
 

|-
|colspan=14|
|-
|colspan=14|Source:

References

1979 elections in Iran
Gilan Province